Events from the year 1880 in Germany.

Incumbents

National level
 Kaiser – William I
 Chancellor – Otto von Bismarck

State level

Kingdoms
 King of Bavaria – Ludwig II of Bavaria
 King of Prussia – Kaiser William I
 King of Saxony – Albert of Saxony
 King of Württemberg – Charles I of Württemberg

Grand Duchies
 Grand Duke of Baden – Frederick I
 Grand Duke of Hesse – Louis IV
 Grand Duke of Mecklenburg-Schwerin – Frederick Francis II
 Grand Duke of Mecklenburg-Strelitz – Frederick William
 Grand Duke of Oldenburg – Peter II
 Grand Duke of Saxe-Weimar-Eisenach – Charles Alexander

Principalities
 Schaumburg-Lippe – Adolf I, Prince of Schaumburg-Lippe
 Schwarzburg-Rudolstadt – George Albert, Prince of Schwarzburg-Rudolstadt
 Schwarzburg-Sondershausen – Gonthier Frederick Charles II, Prince of Schwarzburg-Sondershausen to 17 July, then Charles Gonthier, Prince of Schwarzburg-Sondershausen
 Principality of Lippe – Woldemar, Prince of Lippe
 Reuss Elder Line – Heinrich XXII, Prince Reuss of Greiz
 Reuss Younger Line – Heinrich XIV, Prince Reuss Younger Line
 Waldeck and Pyrmont – George Victor, Prince of Waldeck and Pyrmont

Duchies
 Duke of Anhalt – Frederick I, Duke of Anhalt
 Duke of Brunswick – William, Duke of Brunswick
 Duke of Saxe-Altenburg – Ernst I, Duke of Saxe-Altenburg
 Duke of Saxe-Coburg and Gotha – Ernst II, Duke of Saxe-Coburg and Gotha
 Duke of Saxe-Meiningen – Georg II, Duke of Saxe-Meiningen

Events
 3 April – German company Munich Re is founded.
 14 August – Construction of the Cologne Cathedral is finally completed after over 600 years.

Undated
 German company Bilfinger is founded.

Births
 8 February – Franz Marc, German painter (died 1916)
 21 February – Waldemar Bonsels, German writer (died 1952)
 10 April – Hans Purrmann, German painter (died 1966)
 6 May – Ernst Ludwig Kirchner, German painter, draftsman, printmaker, sculptor, and writer (died 1938)
 14 May – Wilhelm List, German field marshal (died 1971)
 15 May – F. K. Otto Dibelius, German bishop of the Evangelical Church in Berlin-Brandenburg (died 1967)
 29 May – Oswald Spengler, German historian (died 1936)
 25 June – Erich Emminger, German politician (died 1951)
 29 June – Ludwig Beck, German general (died 1944)
 1 July – Herbert Koch, German archaeologist (died 1962)
 3 July – Carl Schuricht, German conductor (died 1967)
 11 July 
 Dorothea Köring, German tennis player (died 1945)
 Friedrich Lahrs, German architect (died 1964)
 12 July – Prince Friedrich Wilhelm of Prussia, Prussian nobleman (died 1925)
 5 August – Hermann Lüdemann, German politician (died 1959)
 30 August – Konrad von Preysing, German prelate of Roman-Catholic Church (died 1950)
 14 September – Karl Kimmich, German banker (died 1945)
 28 September – Otto Sackur, German physical chemist (died 1914)
 14 October – Bruno Heinemann, German officer (died 1918)
 1 November – Alfred Wegener, German polar researcher, geophysicist and meteorologist (died 1930)
 11 November – Alexander Behm, German physicist (died 1952)
 20 November – Walter Brack, German swimmer (died 1919)
 3 December – Fedor von Bock, German field marshal (died 1945)

Deaths

 4 January – Anselm Feuerbach, German painter (born 1829)
 4 January – Karl Friedrich Lessing, German painter (born 1808)
 12 January – Ida, Countess von Hahn-Hahn, German author and novelist (born 1805)
 12 February – Karl von Holtei, German poet and actor (born 1798)
 15 February – Ernst August Hagen, German writer and novelist (born 1797)
 17 February – Paul Mendelssohn Bartholdy, German chemist (born 1841)
 29 March – Heinrich Bernhard Oppenheim, German publicist and philosopher (born 1819)
 6 May – Friedrich Bayer, German entrepreneur (born 1825)
 22 May – Heinrich von Gagern, German politician (born 1799)
 13 June – Heinrich Strack, German architect (born 1805)
 18 August - Baron Karl Ludwig von der Pfordten, German attorney and politician (born 1811)
 30 August – Hermann Anschütz, German painter (born 1802)
 13 December – Martin Gropius, German architect (born 1824)

References

 
Years of the 19th century in Germany